John Anthony Stankovic is an American computer scientist. He is currently the BP America Professor in the Computer Science Department at the University of Virginia and the director of the Link Lab at the university's School of Engineering and Applied Science.

Stankovic received a B.Sc. in electrical engineering from Brown University in 1970. After graduating, he worked at Bell Labs in Whippany, New Jersey. Stankovic returned to Brown for graduate studies, completing an M.Sc. and Ph.D. in 1975 and 1979 under the mentorship of Andries van Dam.

Prior to joining the University of Virginia, Stankovic taught at the University of Massachusetts Amherst.

References

External links 

 

Year of birth missing (living people)
American computer scientists
University of Virginia faculty
Brown University alumni
Living people